In January and February 2022, landslides occurred in Colombia.

Palocabildo landslides

On 26–28 January 2022, two people were killed in Palocabildo, Tolima after heavy rainfall. Many power outages were reported.

Dosquebradas landslide

On 8 February 2022, in Dosquebradas, Risaralda, heavy rains caused a landslide, killing at least 14 people and destroying five homes. 35 people were hospitalized.

See also
 Weather of 2022

References

2022 meteorology
February 2022 events in Colombia
January 2022 events in Colombia
Landslides in 2022
2022
2022 disasters in Colombia